José María León Jiménez (17 April 1893 – 2 August 1936) was a Spanish Socialist Workers' Party politician and supporter of the Second Spanish Republic during the Spanish Civil War. He was executed by the Nationalists of Francisco Franco during the White Terror.

References

External links
 Moreno Gómez, Francisco (2008). 1936: el genocidio franquista en Córdoba. Ed. Crítica, Barcelona. .  pp. 257, 264, 272 y 842.
Biografía de Rafael Aparicio de Arcos.
Entrevista a su hija, Virginia León Lucena.

1893 births
1936 deaths
Spanish Socialist Workers' Party politicians
Alcaldes of the Second Spanish Republic
Victims of the White Terror (Spain)
Politicians from Andalusia
People from Campiña Sur (Córdoba)